Engystomops randi is a species of frog in the family Leptodactylidae. It is endemic to western Ecuador. It inhabits lowland deciduous and semi-deciduous forest and evergreen Costa forest. It also inhabits open man-made habitats, such as pastures, near buildings, and agricultural lands (flooded rice fields, banana plantations). Breeding takes place in small pools during the rainy season. The species makes a floating foam nest.

References

randi
Amphibians of Ecuador
Endemic fauna of Ecuador
Taxonomy articles created by Polbot
Amphibians described in 2004